Morningside Drive was one of the top disco bands of Long Island, New York and the tri-state area between 1971 and 1979, playing at such popular nightclubs as Copperfield's, The 1890s Club of Baldwin, and The Winner's Circle in Westbury.  It was among several bands, including the ST-4 and The Trammps, to popularize the dance craze. Between 1975 and 1976 the band recorded and released their most popular songs, "Will You Love Me Tomorrow" and "The Sun Ain't Gonna Shine Anymore" (both covers).  An album was recorded in 1977, but was never released.

In January 2006, the six original members reunited for the first time at The Winner's Circle, and have since done several additional reunions at various clubs.

External links
 Morningside Drive — The band's official website.

American disco groups
Musical groups from Long Island